Queen of Mean is the nickname of American businesswoman and real estate entrepreneur Leona Helmsley (1920–2007).

Queen of Mean may also refer to:

People
Lisa Lampanelli (born 1961), American comedian
Kathy Long (born 1964), American retired five time world kickboxing champion and mixed martial arts fighter
Anne Robinson (born 1944), British presenter and game show host
Florence King (1936–2016), American novelist, essayist and columnist

Other
"Queen of Mean" (song), a song performed by Sarah Jeffery, featured in the 2019 TV film Descendants 3
Angelica Pickles, a character in the Nickelodeon animated shows Rugrats and All Grown Up!